Kandikuppam is a panchayat in Bargur Block Krishnagiri district in the state of Tamil Nadu, India. The economy is dependent on mango cultivation. Chennai is the state capital for Kandikuppam village. It is located around 223.5 kilometer away from Kandikuppam.. The other nearest state capital from Kandikuppam is Bangalore and its distance is 93.7 km. The other surrounding state capitals are Bangalore 93.7 km., Pondicherry 178.4 km., Thiruvananthapuram 463.4 km.,
Kandikuppam is located along Chennai – Krishnagiri National Highway (NH – 48). Banks and ATM: Indian Bank with ATM,  1 India ATM.  Central Government own India Post Branch post office.
The surrounding nearby villages and its distance from Kandikuppam are Achamangalam 2.6 km, Kurumber Theru 1.9 km, Thandavanpallam 1.5 km, Varattanapalli 4.3 km, Karakuppam 5.4 km, Bargur 6.6 km, Thogarapalli 6.7 km, Jagadevi 6.9 km, Mallapadi 8.0 km, Oppathavadi 10.1 km, Valasagoundanoor 21.9 km, Jingalkathirampatti 27.1 km, Parandapalli 28.5 km, Kottagaram.

Schools in and around Kandikuppam

Kandikuppam nearest schools has been listed as follows.

St Xaviers middle school

Government Primary School Kurumber Theru 1.9 km.
Kingsley Gardens Matric Hr Sec School Kandhikuppam	0.6 km.
St Antonys Hr Sec School 1.8 km.
St Antony's Elamentry School 1.8 km.
St Joseph's Convent School And Hospital 1.9 km.
Varatanapali Govt Hr Sec School School 3.5 km.

Religious place
Sri Bhairava Nilayam is Kalabhairava temple in Kandikuppam become one of the tourist place in Kandikuppam, Krishnagiri District.

Vinnarasi Madha Church also famous among Catholic Christians around this village.

Hotels / Companies / Unites in Kandikuppam

Construction material shop
Stores available to procure construction material like Bulk material - M-Sand, River sand, 20mm, 12mm stones, etc.., Cement, Re bars. Electrical, Plumbing materials shops.

Annai Hotel
Place to taste breakfast, Lunch, veg & Non veg food varieties on NH 48 in kandikuppam

Transport Facilities

Kandikuppam is located along Chennai – Bangaluru National Highway (NH – 48) so connectivity to other districts & nearest towns Krishnagiri, Bargur, Tirupattur, vaniyambadi, Natrampalli, Vellor etc.., much more public Transport (Government) & Private Transports there any time.

Nearest airport to Kandikuppam

Kandikuppam's nearest airport is Hosur Aerodrome situated at 60.3 km distance. Few more airports around Kandikuppam are as follows.

Hosur Aerodrome	60.3 km.
HAL Airport	83.3 km.
Salem Airport	88.9 km.

Nearest districts to Kandikuppam
The other nearest district headquarters is Krishnagiri situated at 11 km distance from Kandikuppam . Surrounding districts from Kandikuppam are as follows.

Dharmapuri ( dharmapuri ) district	48.3 km.
Kolar ( kolar ) district	69.0 km.
Vellore(tiruppatur) district 	34.00 km.
Tiruvannamalai ( tiruvannamalai ) district	93.5 km.
Salem ( salem ) district	97.7 km.

References

Villages in Krishnagiri district
Krishnagiri district